Pouteria hotteana, the redmammee,  is a species of plant in the family Sapotaceae. It is found in Haiti and Puerto Rico.

References

hotteana
Endangered plants
Taxonomy articles created by Polbot
Taxa named by Charles Baehni
Taxa named by Ignatz Urban
Taxa named by Erik Leonard Ekman